Czech News Center a.s. (previously known as Ringier Axel Springer CZ a.s.) is one of the largest media houses in the Czech Republic.

Overview 
The company publishes several daily newspapers (Blesk, Aha! and Sport), many printed magazines, online magazines, web projects, applications and run the services of a virtual operator and printing works. The sole owner of the company is Czech Media Invest a.s., which is indirectly owned by Daniel Křetínský and Patrik Tkáč.

The subsidiary is the Czech Print Center a. s., with operations in Prague and Ostrava. CNC also has a 27% share in the largest Czech company for print distribution PNS, a. s.

Company management 
As of 1 February 2020, the management of the company consists of:

 CEO — Libuše Šmuclerová
 Director of Central Production and Distribution — Libor Berka
 Director of marketing and other commercial activities — Jaroslav Sodomka
Director of digital media — Petr Fryš
CFO — Tomáš Stránský
Advertising director — David Šaroch

Commercials

Academy of Journalism 
The Academy of Journalism and New Media is a common project of Czech News Center a.s. and PB — Higher Vocational and Secondary School of Management. Its main service is dedicated to comprehensive education and practice in the field of modern journalism.

BLESKmobil 
BLESKmobil is the first and largest domestic virtual mobile operator. It was launched in November 2012. Its service include advantageous prepaid calls and SMS. At present, BLESKmobil is the strongest virtual operator on the Czech market, with more than 350,000 activated SIM cards.

BLESK wallet 
The BLESK wallet project was launched in 2014. It works on the same basis as a prepaid mobile SIM card. It is possible to top it up with cash at Sazka's terminals, or on the bleskpenezenka.cz website with any payment card issued in the Czech Republic and Slovakia.

BLESK energy 
The BLESK energy is a supplier of gas and electricity. The project was started in 2014. Each new client receives an additional bonus upon registration — the value of 2 years of savings for energy supply, paid in advance.

References

External links 

 Official website
LinkedIn Profile

Online companies of the Czech Republic
Mass media companies of the Czech Republic
Companies based in Prague
Magazine publishing companies
Newspaper companies
Online publishing companies
Publishing companies established in 1991
1991 establishments in Czechoslovakia